Valentin Lukas Blass (born 17 April 1995) is a German professional basketball player who formerly played for the Telekom Baskets Bonn of the German Basketball League.

References

External links
 Eurocup Profile
 German BBL Profile
 Eurobasket.com Profile

1995 births
Living people
Bayer Giants Leverkusen players
German men's basketball players
Shooting guards
Small forwards
Sportspeople from Munich
Telekom Baskets Bonn players